Tania Saulnier is a Canadian actress, perhaps best known for her role in the film Slither. Saulnier was born in Vancouver, British Columbia, Canada. Once a competitive dancer, and motor-sport enthusiast Tania's first notable acting role came in 1998 with a small part as Marcey Bennett, in one episode of Cold Squad. From there she moved on to various projects, one of which was playing Taylor Langford in the short-lived Nickelodeon series Caitlin's Way, for which she was nominated for a 2001 Leo Award as Best Performance in a Youth or Children's Program or Series. She went on to act in small roles on various television shows, such as Smallville, and in the Supernatural episode "Scarecrow". This was followed by her supporting role in James Gunn's horror film Slither as Kylie Strutemyer. Saulnier has appeared in several films, including The Invisible and In the Name of the King: A Dungeon Siege Tale.

Filmography

Awards and nominations

External links

Canadian film actresses
Canadian television actresses
Living people
Year of birth missing (living people)